Tirur railway station (Code:TIR) is the oldest railway station in Kerala. It is a major railway station serving the town of Tirur in Malappuram district of Kerala. It lies in the Shoranur–Mangalore section of the Southern Railways. Almost all passenger, Superfast and express trains have a halt here. The station has three platforms and four tracks. Though no trains originate from this station, trains halting at the station connect the town to prominent cities in India such as Thiruvananthapuram, Kochi, Kozhikode, Kollam, Thrissur, Kannur, Chennai, Mumbai, Bangalore, Coimbatore, Pondicherry, New Delhi, Mangalore, Pune, Jaipur, Jammu Tawi, Okha, Ahmedabad, Kolkata and so on. This is an "A" class railway station which earns more than 30 crore per annum. It has now been upgraded to a Model Railway Station (Adarsh). The first railway line in Kerala was commissioned on 12 March 1861 from Beypore to Tirur . The proposed high-speed rail has a stop in Tirur. The new backside entrance and parking area are being set up on the eastern side of the station, opening to Tirur Market.

History
The history of railways in Kerala traces back to Tirur. Tirur Railway station is the oldest station in the state. The stations at Tanur, Parappanangadi, and  Vallikkunnu also form parts of the oldest railway line in the state laid from Tirur to Beypore. The line started functioning on March 12, 1861. In the same year, it was extended from Tirur to Kuttippuram via Tirunavaya. Later, it was further extended from Kuttippuram to Pattambi in 1862, and was again extended from Pattambi to Podanur in the same year. The current Chennai-Mangalore railway line was later formed as an extension of the Beypore - Podanur line thus constructed. 

The historical Wagon tragedy of 1921 was happened in a wagon from Tirur to Podanur.

Incidents
 Wagon tragedy

Upcoming facilities
New platform and ticket counter, 4 lifts and expansion of foot overbridge . The work is almost over.

See also
 Tirunnavaya railway station
 Wagon tragedy
 Mangalore Mail
 Tirur
 Malappuram
 Malappuram district
 Transportation in Malappuram district

References

Railway stations in Malappuram district
Palakkad railway division
Railway stations opened in 1861
1861 establishments in British India